The Birla Institute of Scientific Research (BISR) is a private not-for-profit research institute based in Jaipur, India.  The organization is a sisters concern of Birla Institute of Technology, Mesra, Ranchi.  The institute's research goals is purely on Research and Development in frontiers areas of  Biotechnology, Bioinformatics and Remote Sensing. The institute has had a few funded projects from Department of Science and Technology, Indian Council of Medical Research, Government of India. The organization is a part of Biotechnology Information Systems Network, Government of India (BTISNET).

Departments
Department of Biotechnology and Bioinformatics
Department of Remote Sensing

Collaborations
BISR currently has research collaboration with the following organisations.

Birla Institute of Technology, Mesra, Ranchi
S.M.S. Medical College and Research Centre, Jaipur    
L' Institut National de La Recherche Scientifique-Eau Terre et Environment Centre, Quebec, Canada
Indian Academy of Clinical Research, Jaipur

References

Research institutes in Rajasthan
Year of establishment missing
Organisations based in Jaipur